Thomas Nesbitt Gallacher (born 3 April 1936) is a Scottish former first-class cricketer.

Gallacher was born at Kilmarnock in April 1936, where he was educated at the Kilmarnock Academy. A club cricketer for Kilmarnock Cricket Club, he made his debut for Scotland in first-class cricket against the Marylebone Cricket Club at Glasgow in 1965. He made three further first-class appearances for Scotland, playing two further matches in 1965 against the touring New Zealanders and Ireland, before making a further appearance against Cambridge University at Fenner's in 1966. In his four first-class appearances, Gallacher scored 126 runs at an average of 25.20; he made one half century, a score of 73 against the touring New Zealanders at Glasgow.

References

External links
 

1936 births
Living people
Sportspeople from Kilmarnock
People educated at Kilmarnock Academy
Scottish cricketers